Wolfgang Drobetz (born February 26, 1971) is an economist at the University of Hamburg. He is known for his work in corporate finance and asset management. He also is in the editor board of the journal Financial Markets and Portfolio Management (FMPM).

Selected publications

External links
Profile on institute website

Living people
Austrian economists
Economics educators
1971 births
University of Hamburg